Kevin Peeters (born 5 February 1987 in Lier) is a Belgian former cyclist.

Major results

2008
 3rd Memorial Van Coningsloo
 3rd Gooikse Pijl
2010
 8th Schaal Sels
2011
 4th Beverbeek Classic
 4th Schaal Sels
 7th Memorial Rik Van Steenbergen
 8th De Vlaamse Pijl
 10th Kampioenschap van Vlaanderen
2012
 2nd Grote 1-MeiPrijs
 3rd Grand Prix Impanis-Van Petegem
 7th Nationale Sluitingsprijs
 9th Ronde van Limburg
2014
 1st Grand Prix Criquielion
 6th Gooikse Pijl
 9th Kernen Omloop Echt-Susteren
2015
 5th Ronde van Overijssel

References

External links

1987 births
Living people
Belgian male cyclists
People from Lier, Belgium
Cyclists from Antwerp Province